David Hugh Murray (28 December 1909 – 5 April 1973) was a British racing driver from Scotland. He participated in five Formula One World Championship Grands Prix, debuting on 13 May 1950, and also founded the Ecurie Ecosse Scottish motor racing team, based at Merchiston Mews in Edinburgh.

Murray was a chartered accountant by profession and raced an ERA and subsequently a Maserati 4CLT both domestically and in European events, before forming Ecurie Ecosse in 1952. He also participated in rallies and hill-climbs. After one World Championship event, for Ecosse, Murray retired as a driver to concentrate on running the team. Ecurie Ecosse won the Le Mans 24-hour race in both 1956 and 1957 each time with a Jaguar D-Type.

Murray moved abroad and was killed in a road accident in the Canary Isles on 5 April 1973.

Racing record

24 Hours of Le Mans results

Complete Formula One World Championship results
(key)

Complete Formula One non-championship results
(key)

References

External links
Ecurie Ecosse

1909 births
1973 deaths
Scottish racing drivers
Scottish Formula One drivers
Scottish expatriates in Spain
Scuderia Ambrosiana Formula One drivers
Ecurie Ecosse Formula One drivers
Sportspeople from Edinburgh
Businesspeople from Edinburgh
Road incident deaths in Spain
Sports car racing team owners
20th-century Scottish businesspeople